Ionuț Ilie (born 2 January 1993) is a Romanian male weightlifter, competing in the 62 kg category and representing Romania at international competitions. He competed at world championships, including at the 2015 World Weightlifting Championships. He also competed at the 2016, and 2017 European Weightlifting Championships.

Major results

References

External links
 

1993 births
Living people
Romanian male weightlifters
Place of birth missing (living people)
European Weightlifting Championships medalists
20th-century Romanian people
21st-century Romanian people